The sport of football in the country of Eswatini (formerly Swaziland) is run by the Eswatini Football Association. The association administers the national football team, as well as the Premier League. Association football (soccer) is the most popular sport in the country.

Eswatini stadiums

References